Walter Webb may refer to:
 Walter Prescott Webb, American historian
 Walter Freeman Webb, American ornithologist, conchologist and shell dealer
 H. Walter Webb, American railway executive
 Wally Webb, Australian rugby league player